(born Kim Sin-rak; ; November 14, 1924 – December 15, 1963), better known as Rikidōzan, was a Korean-born Japanese wrestler who competed in sumo and professional wrestling. He was known as The Father of Puroresu, and one of the most influential persons in professional wrestling history. Initially, he had moved from his native country Korea to Japan to become a rikishi (sumo wrestler). He was credited with bringing the sport of professional wrestling to Japan at a time when the Japanese needed a local hero to emulate and was lauded as a national hero. He was inducted into the WWE Hall of Fame in 2017, becoming the first Korean inductee and the third puroresu star to be inducted after Antonio Inoki and Tatsumi Fujinami. He was killed in a street fight with a member of the Sumiyoshi-ikka in 1963.

Biography

Early years 
Rikidōzan was born Kim Sin-rak in Kankyō-nan, Chōsen (now South Hamgyong, North Korea), on November 14, 1924. He was the youngest son of Kim Soktee, the owner of a Korean farm with a Confucian tradition, and his wife Chon Gi. When his father fell ill, Sin-rak tended to him, while his mother and older brothers tended to the farm. Kim participated in ssireum in his youth, and after placing third in a local competition spoke to Minosuke Momota. The father-in-law of a Japanese man from Omura who had moved to North Korea to become a policeman, Momota was interested in sumo and supported the Nishonoseki stable. He had recruited several Korean boys for the stable, and persuaded him to join as well. However, his family refused to let him go to Japan, due to his responsibility to care for his father. However, after Kim Sok-tee's death in 1939, Sin-rak left for Japan the following year over his mother's objections.

Sumo career and retirement (1940–1951) 

Joining the Nishonoseki stable, Kim debuted in June 1940. At first, his Korean origins were indicated on sumo ranking sheets, and he received harassment and racial discrimination for this. However, he was adopted by Momota and took the name Mitsuhiro Momota, and a story was fabricated that he had been born in Omura,  Nagasaki. Despite this, he did not attain Japanese citizenship until 1951. He was given the shikona of Rikidōzan. He reached the top makuuchi division in 1946 and was runner-up to yokozuna Haguroyama in the tournament of June 1947, losing a playoff for the championship. He fought in 23 tournaments in total, with a win–loss record of 135–82. His highest rank was sekiwake, though he was reportedly close to a promotion to ōzeki before his retirement.

Several reasons have been given for Rikidōzan's retirement. The amount of success he had earned despite his humble beginnings was a source of envy amongst his seniors in Nishonoseki. Racial discrimination may have also been a factor, but the impetus for his retirement came due to a financial dispute with stable-master Tamanoumi Daitarō. Rikidozan felt that his substantial contributions to the stable made him worthy of major financial support, but Tamanoumi considered him selfish, and he was refused after a heated argument. While the public explanation for his retirement claimed that he suffered from paragonimiasis, the truth was that on September 10, 1950, soon after the argument with Tamanoumi, Rikidozan "impulsively" cut his own chonmage.

After his retirement, Rikidozan initially worked alongside Americans as a black marketeer. His business came through purchasing the belongings of US soldiers departing for service in Korea, and selling these goods to the Japanese. He eventually left this job, and after a petition to return to sumo was rejected, he was given work as a construction supervisor by his former patron Shinsaku Nitta. Nitta had worked in a Tokyo prisoner-of-war camp during World War II, and had secretly provided American prisoners with food and cigarettes; to repay him for his kindness, former prisoners who went on to work at the GHQ gave his construction company preferential treatment when contracting reconstruction work. Nitta also had ties to the criminal underworld, and had been deeply involved with sumo in this manner.

Professional wrestling career (1951–1963)

Debut, American excursion, and megastardom (1951–1958) 
In July 1951, the Tokyo-based Torii Oasis Shriners Club announced their intent to sponsor a charity drive for disabled children, for which they would arrange a professional wrestling tour. These events would be promoted by Honolulu businessman Moe Lipton. Around this time, Rikidōzan reportedly expressed interest in becoming a professional wrestler. In September, wrestling promoter Al Karasick of Honolulu-based Mid-Pacific Promotions announced that he, alongside Joe Malcewicz of NWA San Francisco, had secured a deal with Lipton. Karasick and Malcewisz would send six wrestlers for a twelve-date tour, held from September 30 to December 11. These wrestlers included Harold Sakata and Mid-Pacific booker Bobby Bruns. While Bruns was in Japan before the tour began, he invited Rikidozan, as well as judoka Kokichi Endo and Yasuyuki Sakabe, to participate in these events. After one month of training, Rikidozan made his professional wrestling debut at Ryogoku Memorial Hall on October 28, 1951, wrestling Bruns to a ten-minute time-limit draw. He would continue to work on the rest of the tour, although he would later comment that he had done so with great difficulty, as he lacked the stamina required of wrestlers.

Rikidōzan left Japan in February 1952 to work in America for further training and experience. This began with a five-month stint for Mid-Pacific Promotions, where he was trained by Oki Shikina.

He established himself as Japan's biggest wrestling star by defeating one American wrestler after another. This was shortly after World War II, and the Japanese needed someone who could stand up to the Americans. Rikidōzan thus became immensely popular in Japan. His American opponents assisted him by portraying themselves as villains who cheated in their matches. Rikidōzan himself was booked as a villain when he wrestled in America early on but went on to become one of the first Japanese wrestlers to be cheered as a baby face in post World War II America.

NWA International Heavyweight Champion (1958–1963)
Rikidōzan gained worldwide renown when he defeated Lou Thesz for the NWA International Heavyweight Championship on August 27, 1958, in Japan. In another match, Thesz willingly agreed to put over Rikidōzan at the expense of his own reputation. This built up mutual respect between the two wrestlers, and Rikidōzan never forgot what Thesz did. He would go on to capture several NWA titles in matches both in Japan and overseas. Rikidōzan also trained professional wrestling students, including soon-to-be wrestling legends Kanji "Antonio" Inoki, Ooki Kintaro, and Shohei "Giant" Baba.

His signature move was the karate chop, which was actually based on sumo's harite, rather than actual karate. Rikidozan had likely conceived the move while being with a Korean-born Karateka, Hideo Nakamura, who was one of Rikidozan's dearest friends. It was rumoured that he had been coached by fellow Korean Masutatsu Oyama.

With his success in pro wrestling, Rikidōzan began acquiring properties such as nightclubs, hotels, condominiums and boxing promotions. He established the Japan Pro Wrestling Alliance (JWA), Japan's first professional wrestling promotion, in 1953. His first major feud was against Masahiko Kimura, the famous judoka who had been invited by Rikidōzan to compete as a professional wrestler.  Other famous feuds included those against Thesz in 1957–58, against Freddie Blassie in 1962, and against The Destroyer in 1963.  In wrestling journalist John M. Molinaro's 2002 book Top 100 Pro Wrestlers of All Time, it is noted that two of Rikidōzan's matches are rated in the top ten television programs of all time in Japan.  His October 6, 1957 sixty-minute draw with Lou Thesz for the NWA World Heavyweight Championship drew an 87.0 rating, and his May 24, 1963 sixty-minute two out of three falls draw with The Destroyer drew a 67.0 rating, but a larger viewing audience (the largest in Japanese history) than the previous match, since more people had television sets by 1963.

Personal life 

Aside from pro wrestling, Rikidōzan was a businessman and began acquiring properties such as nightclubs, hotels, condominiums and boxing gyms. Rikidōzan's luxurious apartment, known as Riki Mansion, is located in Akasaka, Tokyo and is recognisable for the large "R" printed on the side of the building. Rikidōzan also owned a 9-storey "Riki Sports Palace" in Shibuya, Tokyo, which included a bowling alley, a pool room, a bar known as "Club Riki", and a restaurant known as "Riki Restaurant". Shortly before his death, Rikidōzan had purchased land in Lake Sagami and had begun work on a large scale golf course to be known as "Lakeside Country Club", set to feature facilities such as a shooting range, indoor skate rink, hotel, and more along the shore of Sagami Lake. However, it remained incomplete due to his death and was eventually sold and became Sagami Lake Resort, a hotel.

Rikidōzan was known to have many girlfriends throughout his lifetime and was often known to see numerous women at the same time. He married his wife, Keiko Tanaka shortly before his death. A 1984 article in weekly Playboy drew much attention after it revealed Rikidōzan was actually from Korea and had been married and had children before he met Tanaka, considered to be taboo in Japan.

After his wrestling matches, he would often immediately go to Riki Sports Palace and start drinking without cleaning up any wounds. He was known to joke with bar staff and say "work was awful today" while either being covered in blood or having a large scar on his face.

According to "Why did Masahiko Kimura not kill Rikidozan?", Rikidozan had a friendship with Hideo Nakamura, who also from the northern part of the Korean Peninsula. It is said that Rikidozan adored Nakamura and called him "Hyung Nim (형님)", which means his older brother in Korean.

Rikidōzan spent his spare time hunting and was said to own several legitimate hunting guns at the time of his death. His autobiography also claimed that Rikidozan made his wife carry a handgun wherever she went. He would also play shogi with professional player Kusama Matsuji.

After Rikidōzan's death, actor Ikuro Otsuji also lived in Riki Mansion in his later years.

After his death, his son, Mitsuo Momota said that while Rikidōzan owned a lot of property and real estate, he also had a lot of debt, and the inheritance tax on his estate was upwards of ¥20,000,000 ($180,000) due to Rikidōzan owing millions of yen in unpaid taxes.

Due to the notoriety he gained from his wrestling career, Rikidōzan was a huge celebrity in Japan and was frequently discussed in tabloids and magazines. Despite his image of a national hero, he had a reputation for being a troublemaker, especially in the later years of his career. Due to his deteriorating physical health, Rikidōzan began to abuse painkillers in the early 1960s and would take stimulants before and after his matches.

When Rikidōzan was in a good mood, he would leave bar staff a tip of as much as ¥10,000, but when he was in a bad mood, bar fights and violence were an almost daily event. Rikidōzan's reputation for being a heavy drinker also aroused suspicion surrounding the legitimacy of pro wrestling, as he would "fight" opponents and then be seen drinking and socialising with them just hours later. At one point, Rikidōzan was in a bar with Roberto Barbon, a Cuban baseball player for the Hankyu Braves, who had been drinking and started heckling Rikidōzan, calling professional wrestling fake. Rikidōzan became hostile, threatening violence and demanding an apology, which Barbon agreed to.

Death 

On December 8, 1963, Rikidōzan was stabbed once by Katsushi Murata, a member of the ninkyō dantai Sumiyoshi-ikka, a sub branch of the yakuza, after an altercation in a nightclub. Rikidōzan alleged that Murata stepped on his shoe, and demanded an apology. Murata refused and the two began to argue which eventually led to Rikidōzan punching Murata in the face, knocking him against a wall. Rikidōzan then mounted Murata and continued to punch him on the ground until Murata stabbed Rikidōzan once in the abdomen. Both immediately fled the scene and Rikidōzan was taken to Sannoh Hospital, where a doctor decreed the wound to be non-serious but advised Rikidōzan to have surgery. The surgery was successful and he returned home, but went against doctor's orders and began eating and drinking the same day, sending his assistant to the store for sushi and sake. Due to drinking so much, Rikidōzan worsened his condition and required a second surgery one week later, but had developed peritonitis and died at approximately 9:50pm on December 15, 1963. He was 39 years old.

Rikidōzan's funeral was held on December 20, 1963, in Ikegami Honmonji Temple in Ōta, Tokyo. Among those in attendance were Rikidōzan's students, Antonio Inoki, Giant Baba, and Kintaro Ohki as well as various other opponents from throughout his career.

Katsushi Murata was later found guilty of manslaughter in October 1964 and served eight years in prison before being released in 1972. Murata visited the grave of Rikidōzan every year on December 15 following his release. He also called the sons of Rikidōzan and apologised yearly. In the years following his release, Murata became a high-ranking member of the Yakuza. Murata died on April 9, 2013, from natural causes.

Family 
One of his sons, Mitsuo Momota, followed his father into the ring in 1970 and still works as a freelancer, but was never able to earn the recognition that once made his father famous, despite winning the World Junior Heavyweight Championship in 1989. Mitsuo's son, Chikara Momota, made his in-ring debut on December 16, 2013, the day after the fiftieth anniversary of the death of his grandfather. Rikidōzan's other son, Yoshihiro Momota, was also a pro wrestler.

Rikidōzan's son-in-law, Bak Myeong-cheol (박명철), has been a member of the National Defence Commission of North Korea since around early 2009, while Bak Myeong-cheol's younger sister is the vice secretary of the Light Industry Division of the Workers' Party of Korea.

Championships and accomplishments 
 Japan Wrestling Association
 All Asia Heavyweight Championship (1 time)
 All Asia Tag Team Championship (4 times) – with Toyonobori
 JWA All Japan Tag Team Championship (1 time) – with Toyonobori
 NWA International Heavyweight Championship (1 time)
 Japanese Heavyweight Championship (1 time)
 World Big League (5 times)

International Professional Wrestling Hall of Fame
Class of 2021
 Mid-Pacific Promotions NWA Hawaii Tag Team Championship (3 times) – with Bobby Bruns (1), Azumafuji (1) and Koukichi Endoh (1)

 National Wrestling Alliance NWA Hall of Fame (Class of 2011)

 NWA San Francisco NWA Pacific Coast Tag Team Championship (San Francisco version) (1 time) – with Dennis Clary
 NWA World Tag Team Championship (San Francisco version) (1 time) – with Koukichi EndohNorth American Wrestling Alliance / Worldwide Wrestling Associates / NWA Hollywood WrestlingWWA World Heavyweight Championship (1 time)
 Professional Wrestling Hall of Fame and Museum (Class of 2006)
 Wrestling Observer Newsletter awards Wrestling Observer Newsletter Hall of Fame (Class of 1996)

 WWE' WWE Hall of Fame (Class of 2017)

 Sumo top division record 
 Only two tournaments were held through most of the 1940s and only one was held in 1946.

  
    
    
    
  
  
    
    
    
  
  
    
    
    
  
  
    
    
    
  
  
    
    
    
  

 Legacy 

Rikidōzan posthumously became one of the first members of the Wrestling Observer Newsletter Hall of Fame in 1996 and he was  posthumously inducted into the Professional Wrestling Hall of Fame and Museum in 2006, as well as the "Legacy Wing" of the WWE Hall of Fame for the 2017 class. In 2002, Rikidōzan was named the 3rd greatest pro wrestler of all time behind Ric Flair and rival Lou Thesz in the magazine article 100 Wrestlers of All Time by John Molinaro, edited by Dave Meltzer and Jeff Marek.

 Popular culture 

Rikidōzan appeared in 29 films, including お月様には悪いけど Otsukisama ni wa warui kedo (1954, as himself), やがて青空  (1955, as himself), and  力道山物語 怒濤の男 Rikidōzan monogatari dotō no otoko'' (1955 as himself).

See also 

 Glossary of sumo terms
 List of past sumo wrestlers
 List of premature professional wrestling deaths
 List of sekiwake

Notes

References

Bibliography

Further reading

External links 

 
 Puroresu.com: Rikidozan
 Ring Chronicle Hall of Fame: Rikidozan
 Rikodozan at the Online World of Wrestling
 : a film about his life
 

1924 births
1963 deaths
Deaths from peritonitis
Deaths by stabbing in Japan
Japanese murder victims
Japanese people of Korean descent
Japanese male professional wrestlers
Japanese sumo wrestlers
Sekiwake
North Korean wrestlers
Male murder victims
Naturalized citizens of Japan
People murdered in Tokyo
Professional wrestling executives
Professional Wrestling Hall of Fame and Museum
Professional wrestling trainers
People murdered by the Yakuza
Zainichi Korean people
Japanese racehorse owners and breeders
South Korean male professional wrestlers
South Korean sumo wrestlers
Korean murder victims
Korean people murdered abroad
WWE Hall of Fame Legacy inductees
Imperial Japanese Army personnel of World War II
20th-century professional wrestlers
All Asia Tag Team Champions
NWA International Heavyweight Champions
Japan Pro Wrestling Alliance
All Asia Heavyweight Champions